Providence High School in Burbank, California, is a co-ed, independent, Catholic, college preparatory high school, founded by the Sisters of Providence in 1955. Located in the Roman Catholic Archdiocese of Los Angeles.

History
On 19 September 1955, the school admitted 81 girls to its new educational facility. Due to construction delays, the building was not finished upon their arrival, and they start instruction in circus tents in the school parking lot. By November 1955, the school's building completed construction. In 1959, 68 students would attend its first commencement ceremony.

In 1960, the school was accredited by the Board of Admissions and Relations of the University of California. According to the Burbank Leader, in 1974 the school opened as a co-educational institution.

Providence's first head of school, Joe Sciuto served the school until Spring 2019. Administrative leadership changed in the Fall 2019 when Scott McLarty was selected to become Providence High School's second Head of School and changing former Principal Allison Castro's title to Assistant Head of School.

Focus Programs

Cinema Arts Focus Program
The Cinema Arts Focus Program intends to help students explore media through an in-depth hands-on curriculum. The program conducts various activities through the Cinema Arts Focus Center, an art studio accessible to students. Cinema Arts students are given the opportunity to compete in various film competitions and to hear from guest speakers currently working in the industry.

Medical Focus Program
The four-year program covers topics from health, medicine, and biotechnology to health care within political, social, economic, religious and ethical frameworks.

The program is the result of a partnership between Providence High School and Providence Saint Joseph Medical Center. Expansion of the program now includes participation and support of the following organizations/institutions: Providence Holy Cross Medical Center, Shriner's Hospital, University of Southern California University Hospital, LAC+USC Medical Center, Glendale Memorial Hospital, Kaiser Permanente, Midway Medical Center, Huntington Memorial Hospital, and Cedars-Sinai Medical Center.

Technology Focus Program
The Technology Focus Program is designed as a broad-based introduction into various kinds of technology, providing a launching pad for further college study and industry application.

In 2018, the Technology Focus Program Center held its ribbon cutting ceremony unveiling a 32-station computer lab, four 3-D printers, a CNC machine, a mill machine and a laser cutter. This facility is open for Technology Focus Program students enrolled in the four-year program.

References

Roman Catholic secondary schools in Los Angeles County, California
Educational institutions established in 1955
High schools in the San Fernando Valley
Buildings and structures in Burbank, California
1955 establishments in California
Catholic secondary schools in California